The Symphony World Tour was the forth worldwide concert tour by English soprano singer Sarah Brightman. The tour started on 4 November 2008 in the city of Monterrey and concluded on 5 April 2009 in Taipei. There were special guests that joined Brightman during select tour dates: Argentinean's Fernando Lima, Italy's Alessandro Safina, and Greece's Mario Frangoulis. The tour concept was a journey through the musical career that Sarah Brightman has had so far (three decades) and includes several high-tech virtual scenery that takes the audience from an enchanted forest, baroque lamps to an atmosphere of fairytales. Much anticipation surrounded The Symphony World Tour especially since the production cost was reportedly more than $2 million and involved more than 100 tons of equipment.

Set List

Sanvean (Instrumental)
Gothica
Fleurs Du Mal
Let It Rain
Symphony
Forbidden Colours (Interlude)
What A Wonderful World
Dust in the Wind
Nella Fantasia
Hijo de la Luna
La Luna
Sarahbande (Interlude)
Anytime, Anywhere
Storia D'Amore
Canto della Terra  (with Mario Frangoulis in the US, Alessandro Safina for the rest of the world)
Attesa
Intermission
You Take My Breath Away
The Phantom of the Opera  (with Mario Frangoulis in the US, Alessandro Safina for the rest of the world)
Sarai Qui (with Alessandro Safina)
I've Been This Way Before 
Red Riding Hood Rap
First of May
I Believe in Father Christmas
Pasión (with Fernando Lima)
Ave Maria (with Fernando Lima) at some shows 
Time to Say Goodbye
Deliver Me
Running
You And Me

Notes
 Sarai Qui was performed only during shows when Alessandro Safina was the special guest
 You & Me was an additional 3rd encore and performed at least during the 1 April 2009 show in Hong Kong and 4 April 2009 show in Taipei.

Tour dates

References 

2008 concert tours
2009 concert tours
Sarah Brightman concert tours